Andira inermis is a nitrogen-fixing tree native to the area from southern Mexico through Central America to northern South America (Peru, Bolivia, and Brazil); it has been introduced to the Caribbean, the Antilles, Florida, and Africa. The tree has many names due to its wide distribution and multiple uses:  it is also known as the cabbage bark (in Belize), almendro macho (in El Salvador), almendro de río or river almond (Honduras), bastard cabbage tree, cabbage angelin (United States), cabbage bark (United States), cabbage tree, carne asada (Costa Rica), guacamayo (Honduras), Jamaica cabbage tree, harino (Panama),  moca (Puerto Rico), partridge wood (United States), worm bark, or yellow cabbage tree.

The tree grows to approximately 35 metres in height and 0.7 metre in diameter. It is evergreen and unbuttressed and has a dense crown and pink flowers.  It grows primarily in riparian zones in forests along rivers. It can also be found in drier areas, including roadsides, pastures, and woodlands.

The tree's wood is used for lumber, and its smooth gray bark reportedly has narcotic, laxative, and vermifuge properties.

References

External links 
 Andira inermis Winrock Intl – Resource Not Found at www.winrock.org
 Andira inermis Andira inermis (Wright)DC. at www.ildis.org

Faboideae
Trees of Belize
Trees of Brazil
Trees of Trinidad and Tobago
Trees of Guatemala
Trees of Peru